Clathrina angraensis is a species of calcareous sponge from Brazil. The species epithet refers to Angra dos Reis, the Portuguese name for the Botinas Islands.

Description
Massive cormus formed of thin, irregular and tightly anastomosed tubes, particularly in the apical region. The largest specimen collected is 33 x 24 x 8 mm. Water-collecting tubes are present. The skeleton has no special organization, comprising triactines only. Porocytes are easily observed. Triactines are equiangular and equiradiate. Actines are slightly conical, frequently undulated near the tip, and sharp.

References

External links
 World Register of Marine Species entry

Clathrina
Fauna of Brazil
Animals described in 2007